The Price of Coal (Limitation) Act 1915 (5&6 Geo.5 c.) was a war time act of the Parliament of the United Kingdom introduced by Walter Runciman to regulate the price of coal.

References

1915 in law
United Kingdom Acts of Parliament 1915
Emergency laws in the United Kingdom
United Kingdom in World War I
1915 in military history
World War I legislation